The Evolutionary Principle is a largely psychological doctrine which roughly states that when a species is removed from the habitat in which it evolved, or that habitat changes significantly within a brief period (evolutionarily speaking), the species will develop maladaptive or outright pathological behavior. The Evolutionary Principle is important in neo-tribalist and anarcho-primitivist thinking.

Evolution